A , Iberian slap, forearm jerk, Italian salute, or Kozakiewicz's gesture, is an obscene gesture that communicates moderate to extreme contempt, and is roughly equivalent in meaning to "fuck you", "shove it up your ass/arse", or "go fuck yourself", having the same meaning as giving the finger. To make the gesture, an arm is bent in an L-shape, with the fist pointing upwards; the other hand then grips or slaps the biceps of the bent arm as it is emphatically raised to a vertical position.

It is most common in the Romance-speaking world (Spain, Italy, France, Portugal, Romania, Belgium, Latin America, and Québec), Russia, Poland, Hungary, Bulgaria, Croatia, Turkey, Georgia, Ireland and in parts of Scotland.

International nomenclature 

Its most famous occurrence in Italian cinema is in Federico Fellini's  (1953), where the idler played by Alberto Sordi jeers at a group of workmen, combining this gesture with a raspberry.
 In Brazil, the gesture is known as a "banana" and carries the same connotation as giving someone the middle finger. It can also be used to denote disrespectfully ignoring what someone just said, analogous in meaning to the expression, "I don't give a fuck".
 In Japan, the gesture has a positive connotation, often used to convey courage or determination. To perform the gesture, a hand is placed on the opposite biceps, and then the biceps is flexed, as if the flexed biceps were being polished. Sometimes, the gesture appears in video games produced in the country; as a result, it often has to be removed during the process of game localisation to avoid causing offence. 
 Portugal has the term , a diminutive of  'sleeve'. It is also the most characteristic gesture performed by the Portuguese everyman Zé Povinho.
This coincided with the rise of the Solidarity Union in Poland in 1980. 

The gesture is also called  ('from the fist to the elbow').

Notes

References

External links
French gestures, archived from About.com

Hand gestures
Obscenity